Ramati is a surname. Notable people with the surname include:

Alexander Ramati (1921–2006), Polish writer and film director
Roman Haubenstock-Ramati (1919–1994), Polish-Austrian composer and music editor

See also
Rahmati

Jewish surnames